Brinkman, Brinkmann, Brinckman, and Brinckmann are variations of a German and Dutch surname. It is toponymic surname with the same meaning as the surname Van den Brink: "(man) from the village green". Notable people with these surnames include:

Brinkman
Baba Brinkman (born 1978), Canadian rapper and playwright
Bert Brinkman (born 1968), Dutch water polo player
Bryan Brinkman (fl. 2009), American cartoon animator
Carl Gustaf von Brinkman (1764–1847), Swedish-German classicist poet, writer and diplomat
Charles Brinkman (born 1928), American figure skater
Chuck Brinkman (born 1944), American baseball player
Curt Brinkman (1953–2010), American wheelchair racer
Ed Brinkman (1941–2008), American baseball player
Elco Brinkman (born 1948), Dutch politician
Erna Brinkman (born 1972), Dutch volleyball player
Fiona Brinkman (born 1967), Australian-born Canadian bioinformatician
Fred Brinkman (1892–1961), American architect
George Brinkman (born 1972), American spree killer
Henri Brinkman (1908–1961), Dutch mathematician and physicist, namesake of the Brinkman number
Henry W. Brinkman (1881–1949), American architect
Hero Brinkman (born 1964), Dutch politician
Jacques Brinkman (born 1966), Dutch field hockey player
Joe Brinkman (born 1944), American baseball umpire
Johannes Brinkman (1902–1949), Dutch architect
Kiara Brinkman (born 1979), American author
Mat Brinkman (born 1973), American artist and musician
Michiel Brinkman (1873–1925) Dutch architect
Steven Brinkman (born 1979), Canadian volleyball player
Tim Brinkman (born 1997), Dutch footballer
Tom Brinkman (born 1957), American (Ohio) politician

Brinckman
The Brinckman baronets
Sir Theodore Brinckman, 1st Baronet (1798–1880), British MP for Yarmouth
Sir Theodore Brinckman, 2nd Baronet (1830–1905), his son, British Liberal MP for Canterbury
Sir Theodore Brinckman, 4th Baronet (1898–1954), British cricketer

Brinkmann
Ansgar Brinkmann (born 1969), German footballer
Bernd Brinkmann (born 1939), German forensic pathologist
Bernhard Brinkmann (1952-2022), German politician
Beth Brinkmann (born 1958), American lawyer
Carl Brinkmann (1885–1954), German sociologist and economist
Christiane Brinkmann (born 1962), German athlete
Daniel Brinkmann (born 1986), German footballer
Dennis Brinkmann (born 1978), German football defender and coach
Dirk Brinkmann (born 1964), German field hockey player
Gunnar Brinkmann , discoverer of the Brinkmann graph
Hanne Brinkmann (1895–1984), German actress
Hans Brinkmann, discoverer of Brinkmann coordinates
Helmuth Brinkmann (1895–1983), German navy vice-admiral
Patrik Brinkmann (born 1966), Swedish-German businessman and right-wing politician
Philipp Brinkmann, German-Greek entrepreneur 
Rainer Brinkmann (admiral) (born 1958), German Navy admiral
Rainer Brinkmann (politician) (born 1958), German SPD politician
Reinhold Brinkmann (1934–2010), German musicologist
Rolf Dieter Brinkmann (1940–1975), German lyricist and storyteller
Ron Brinkmann (born 1964), American (?) visual effects supervisor
Rudolf Brinkmann (Secretary of State) (1893–1973), German economist
Ruth Brinkmann (1937–1997), American-born Austrian stage actress
Svend Brinkmann (born 1975), Danish psychologist
Thomas Brinkmann (born 1959), German musician, also known as Ester Brinkmann
Thomas Brinkmann (field hockey) (born 1968), German field hockey player
Till Brinkmann (born 1995), German footballer
Vinzenz Brinkmann (born 1958), German classical archaeologist
Werner Brinkmann (born 1946), German jurist and chief executive
Wilhelm Brinkmann (1910–1991), German field handball player
William J. Brinkmann (1874-1911), American architect
Woldemar Brinkmann (1890–1959), German architect and interior designer
Wolfgang Brinkmann (born 1950), German equestrian

Brinckmann
Alfred Brinckmann (1891–1967), German chess master
Henriette Hahn-Brinckmann (1862–1934), Danish-German painter and lithographer
Justus Brinckmann (1843–1915), German museum director
Karl Gustav von Brinckmann (1764–1847), Swedish-German poet, writer and diplomat
Philipp Hieronymus Brinckmann (1709–1761), German painter and engraver

References

Dutch-language surnames
German-language surnames